The Fannie Jackson Coppin Club, also known as the Fanny Jackson Coppin Club, was a club for politically active African American women located in Alameda County, California. The club played an important role in community outreach to voters before and after the passage of Proposition 4 in 1911 which granted women in California the right to vote. Many of the women involved in the club were active in the California suffrage movement.

History of the club 
The Fannie Jackson Coppin Club was formed in Oakland in June 1899 by women of Beth Eden Baptist Church. This club was the first club for African American women in Oakland. It was named after Fanny Jackson Coppin who was the first African American woman to become a school principal. Coppin State University is named after Fannie Jackson. The stated goal of the club was to study culture and community improvement. The state motto of the club was "Deeds Not Words." It also used the motto "Lifting as We Climb". During its heyday, the club served as a "mother club" for black club women in California. Journalist and historian Delilah Beasley reported on the activities of the club in her popular column, "Activities Among the Negroes."

Home for the Aged and Infirm Colored People 
One of the notable 19th century projects organized by the club was the club's involvement in the creation of the Home for the Aged and Infirm Colored People in Oakland, California. This was the first organization to provide care for elderly African Americans in the state of California.

Membership 
Members included many notable Oakland area suffragists and club women including Melba Stafford, Willa Henry, Emma Scott and Hettie B. Tilghman.

Legacy of the club 
Club members created a wide variety of organizations aimed to improve the lives of African Americans in the east bay. Hettie B. Tilghman, Willa Henry, Melba Stafford and Delilah Beasley were very community oriented and in 1920 they created the Linden Center Young Women's Christian Association. The Linden Center YWCA offered vocational training as well as cultural programs. Despite the creation of independent organizations that grew out of the Fannie Jackson Coppin club, it remained intact and lasted well into the 1960s.

See also 

 Fanny Jackson Coppin
 List of California suffragists
 Timeline of the women's suffrage movement in California
Women's suffrage in California

References 

California suffrage
Organizations based in California
Women's suffrage advocacy groups in the United States
YWCA leaders
Feminism in California
African-American women's organizations
African-American history of California